Sar Tang is a village in Hati Rural District, Hati District, Lali County, Khuzestan Province, Iran. At the 2006 census, its population was 148, in 26 families.

References 

Populated places in Lali County